Bicholi Hapsi is a Census Town situated in Indore district of Madhya Pradesh, India.

Demographics
According to the 2011 Indian Census the "Bhicholi Hapsi Census Town" consists total population of 8,774 people amongst them 4,561 are males and 4,213 are females.

References

Census towns in Indore district